

Long course (50 m)

Men

|}

Women

|}

Short course (25 m)

Men

|}

Women

|}

References 
Agendadiana.com, 

Italy